Magic Hour is a 2011 Greek road movie written and directed by Costas Kapakas.

Cast
 Renos Haralambidis as Diomidis
 Tasos Antoniou as Aristeidis

References

External links
 

2011 films
2010s drama road movies
Greek drama films
2010s Greek-language films
2011 drama films